The National Offshore Petroleum Safety and Environmental Management Authority (NOPSEMA) is the Australian Government offshore energy regulator responsible for the health and safety, well integrity and environmental management aspects of offshore oil and gas operations in Australian Commonwealth waters; and in coastal waters where regulatory powers and functions have been conferred by state governments.

NOPSEMA was established under the Offshore Petroleum and Greenhouse Gas Storage Act 2006 (OPGGS Act). It is a corporate Commonwealth entity under the Public Governance, Performance and Accountability Act 2013, and an independent statutory agency under the Public Service Act 1999. NOPSEMA is part of the Industry, Science, Energy and Resources portfolio.

Under NOPSEMA's corporate structure, its Chief Executive Officer is accountable to the Federal Minister for Resources, Water and Northern Australia. Mr Stuart Smith was appointed Chief Executive Officer of NOPSEMA in September 2014.

References

External links 
 Official Site

Government agencies established in 2012
Commonwealth Government agencies of Australia
Petroleum in Australia
Occupational safety and health organizations
Environmental agencies
2012 establishments in Australia
Energy regulatory authorities
Regulatory authorities of Australia